This is a list of prime ministers of Canada by religious affiliation. It notes party affiliation after the name. All Canadian prime ministers have affiliations with Christianity.

In early Canadian history, religion played an important role in politics. The Conservative Party was composed mainly of Anglicans and conservative French-Canadian Catholics while the Liberal Party was backed by reform-minded French Canadian Catholics and non-Anglican English Canadians due to their support in Quebec and Ontario.

List of prime ministers by religious affiliation

Timeline

See also
 Religion in Canada
 Religious affiliations of chancellors of Germany
 Religious affiliations of prime ministers of the Netherlands
 Religious affiliations of presidents of the United States

References

Canada
Religion